Lauren K. Alleyne (born June 8, 1979) is a Trinidadian-American poet, fiction, and nonfiction writer and educator born and raised in the dual-island Caribbean nation of Trinidad and Tobago.

Biography
In 1997, Alleyne moved to the United States to begin her undergraduate studies in Radiologic Science and Nuclear Medical Technology at St. Francis College in New York. It was not until her junior year that she decided to shift her focus towards English, then graduated with honors from St. Francis College with a Bachelor of Arts in English Literature. In 2002, she received her Masters of Fine Arts in English with an emphasis on creative writing from Iowa State. Finally, in January 2006, she received her Master of Fine Arts in Creative Writing, as well as a graduate certificate in Feminist, Gender, and Sexuality studies from Cornell University.

Alleyne is also a graduate of Cave Canem, a non-profit literary service organization with administrative and programming headquarters that works to promote and advance under-represented African-American poets in the literary world, and to provide an environment that fosters the growth of African-American voices and artistry. In addition to serving her talents in the literary community, Alleyne also worked as the Poet-in-Residence and as an Assistant Professor in English at the University of Dubuque in Iowa. Currently, Alleyne works as an Associate Professor in English, and the Assistant Director of the Furious Flower Poetry Center at James Madison University in Virginia.

Alleyne's poems and articles have appeared in many literary journals, including Affilia, Small Axe Project, and Women's Studies Quarterly, and in anthologies such as Gathering Ground: A Reader Celebrating Cave Canem's First Decade and Let Spirit Speak! Cultural Journeys Through the African Diaspora.

Awards and accolades
Alleyne has received many awards and accolades, including the following:
 International Publication Prize from the Atlanta Review
 The Robert Chasen Graduate Poetry Prize at Cornell 
 2003: Atlantic Monthly Student Poetry Prize
 2003: Gival Press Tri-Language Poetry Contest (Honourable Mention)
 2009: Reginald Shepherd Memorial Poetry Prize (Honourable Mention)
 2009, 2011: Dorothy Sargent Rosenburg Prize
 2010: Small Axe Literary Prize
 2010: Cave Canem Poetry Prize (Honourable Mention)
 2012: Lyrical Iowa Award/Lyric Iowa Poetry Prize (2nd place)
 2013: Richard Peterson Award (finalist)

Publications

Books
 Difficult Fruit (Peepal Tree Press, 2014)

Selections available online
 "The Body, Given"
 "Ode to the Belly"  
 "The place of no dreams"
 "Love in B Minor"
 "To My Lover’s Partner, Upon their Separation"
 "Ash Wednesday" 
 "Fear and Trembling"
 "Veneration"

Short stories available online
 "The Way the Body Goes" 
 2012: Writing from Within the War on Women

References

External links

 

American people of Trinidad and Tobago descent
Living people
American women poets
St. Francis College alumni
Iowa State University alumni
Cornell University alumni
James Madison University faculty
1979 births
American women academics
21st-century American women